Native ground is the land belonging to a native (particular) area, tribe (as in Native American or other indigenous people), etc.

Native ground may also refer to:

Native Ground, a 1979 poem by Robert Minhinnick
On Native Ground: Memoirs and Impressions, an autobiography by Jim Barnes
On Native Grounds, a 1942 literary work by Alfred Kazin